Albert Trim (6 October 1875 – 11 July 1954) was an Australian rules footballer who played with South Melbourne and Carlton in the Victorian Football League (VFL).

Football
A defender from Beechworth, Trim played in Beechworth's 1897 Ovens & Murray Football League premiership side.

Trim played in South Melbourne's losing 1899 VFL Grand Final team and captained his club for the 1901 season. He spent his final two league seasons at Carlton and appeared in another losing Grand Final in 1904. During 1899, 1903 and 1904, Trim represented the VFL at interstate football.

In 1905 he moved to Western Australia and played for South Fremantle.  He was elected captain during the season and held the position until the end of 1906.

Death
He died in Western Australia in July 1954.

See also
 The Footballers' Alphabet

Notes

References

External links

 
 
 1897 – Ovens & Murray FA Premiers: Beechworth FC team photo

1875 births
Australian rules footballers from Victoria (Australia)
Sydney Swans players
Carlton Football Club players
1954 deaths
South Fremantle Football Club players